The X-Men are a team of superheroes appearing in American comic books published by the Marvel Comics. The X-Men first appeared in the self-titled X-Men comic, cover dated September 1963. Due to the X-Men's immense popularity, Marvel has launched dozens of spin-off series, called "X-Legs" throughout the years.

Like Uncanny X-Men, most X-books feature mutants, humans born with extraordinary powers due to a genetic mutation. Some X-Books feature mutant superhero teams while others feature solo adventures of characters who became popular in Uncanny X-Men or another X-Book. Occasionally, X-Books use mutants as a metaphor for racial, religious and other minorities oppressed by society.

For the purpose of this list, "X-Men Comics" will be defined by the following criteria:
 The series was meant to continue indefinitely, was not a limited series. For limited series, see List of X-Men limited series.
 The series featured mostly characters associated with and/or concepts originating in Uncanny X-Men or another X-Book, thus The Defenders and The Champions, which featured both X-Men-related and non-X-Men related characters will not be counted and neither will series which occasionally featured the X-Men characters, such as Marvel Comics Presents, Marvel Team-Up and What If?.



A
A+X (2012–2014), #1–18
Adventures of the X-Men (1996–1997), #1–12 (all-new stories continuing the continuity of the Fox Network's X-Men animated series)
Age of Apocalypse (2012–2013), #1–14
Agent X (2002–2004), #1–15
All New Exiles, vol. 1 (1995–1996), #1–11, Infinity
All-New Wolverine, vol. 1 (2015–2018), #1–35, Annual #1
All-New X-Factor (2014–2015), #1–20
All-New X-Men, vol. 1 (2012–2015), #1–41, Annual #1
All-New X-Men, vol. 2 (2016–2017), #1–19, Annual #1, #1.MU
Alpha Flight, vol. 1 (1983–1994), #1–130, Annual #1–2
Alpha Flight, vol. 2 (1997–1999), #1–20, #-1, Annual #1998
Alpha Flight, vol. 3 (2004–2005), #1–12
Alpha Flight, vol. 4 (2011–2012), #1–8, #0.1
Amazing X-Men, vol. 2 (2013–2015), #1–19, Annual #1
Astonishing X-Men, vol. 3 (2004–2013), #1–68, Giant-Size #1, Annual #1
Astonishing X-Men, vol. 4 (2017–2018), #1–17, Annual #1

B
Bishop: The Last X-Man (1999–2001), #1–16
The Brotherhood (2001–2002), #1–9

C
Cable, vol. 1 (1993–2002), #1–107, #-1, Annual '99
Cable, vol. 2 (2008–2010), #1–26, King-Size Spectacular
Cable, vol. 3 (2017–2018), #1–5, #150–159
Cable, vol. 4 (2020–2021), #1–12
Cable & Deadpool (2004–2008), #1–50
Cable and X-Force (2013–2014), #1–19
Children of the Atom (2021), #1–6
Classic X-Men (1986–1990), #1–110 (reprinted late 1970s and early 1980s issues of X-Men, vol. 1, re-titled X-Men Classic from issue #46)
Cyclops, vol. 3 (2014–2015), #1–12

D
Dazzler (1981–1986), #1–42
Daken: Dark Wolverine (2010–2012), #1–23, #9.1
Dark Wolverine (2009–2010), #75–90 (continued from Wolverine vol. 3)
Deadpool, vol. 2 (1997–2002), #1–69, #-1, #0, Daredevil/Deadpool Annual 1997, Deadpool & Death Annual 1998
Deadpool, vol. 3 (2008–2012), #1–63, #33.1, #49.1, Annual #1
Deadpool: Team-Up, vol. 2 (2009–2011), #899-883
Deadpool, vol. 4 (2012–2015), #1–45, Annual #1–2, Bi-Annual #1
Deadpool, vol. 5 (2015–2017), #1–36, #3.1, Annual #1
Deadpool, vol. 6 (2018–2019), #1–15 (LGY #301–315), Annual #1 (continued from Despicable Deadpool vol. 1)
Deadpool Max (2010–2011), #1–12
Deadpool & the Mercs for Money, vol. 2 (2016–2017), #1–10
Deadpool: Merc with a Mouth, vol. 1 (2009–2010), #1–13
Despicable Deadpool, vol. 1 (2017–2018), #287–300 (continued from Deadpool vol. 5)
District X (2004–2005), #1–14
Domino, vol. 3 (2018–2019), #1–10, Annual #1

E
Emma Frost (2003–2004), #1–18
Excalibur, vol. 1 (1988–1998), #1–125, Annual #1–2, #-1
Excalibur, vol. 3 (2004–2005), #1–14
Excalibur, vol. 4 (2019–2021), #1–26
Exiles, vol. 1 (2001–2008), #1–100, Annual #1,
Exiles, vol. 2 (2009), #1–6
Exiles, vol. 3 (2018–2019), #1–12
Extraordinary X-Men (2016–2017), #1–20, Annual #1

F 
Fallen Angels, vol. 2 (2020), #1–6

G 
Gambit, vol. 3 (1999–2001), #1–25, #, Annual '99, 2000
Gambit, vol. 4 (2004–2005), #1–12
Gambit, vol. 5 (2012–2013), #1–17
Generation Hope (2011–2012), #1–17
Generation X, vol. 1(1994–2001), #1–75, #-1, #, Annual '95, '96, '97, Generation X/Dracula Annual 1998, '99
Generation X, vol. 2 (2017–2018), #1–9, #85–87

H

Hellions (2020–2021), #1–18

I
Iceman, vol. 3 (2017–2018), #1–11
Immortal X-Men (2022–ongoing), #1–

J
Jean Grey (2017–2018), #1–11

K
Knights of X (2022), #1–5

L
Legion of X (2022–ongoing), #1–

M
Magneto (2014–2015), #1–21
Maverick (1997–1998), #1–12
Marauders, vol. 1 (2019–2022), #1–27, Annual #1
Marauders, vol. 2 (2022–ongoing)
Mutant X (1998–2001), #1–32, Annual 1999, 2000, 2001
Mystique (2003–2005), #1–24

N
Namor: The First Mutant (2010–2011), #1–11, Annual #1
New Excalibur (2006–2007), #1–24
New Exiles (2008–2009), #1–18, Annual #1
New Mutants, vol. 1 (1983–1991), #1–100, Annual #1–7
New Mutants, vol. 2 (2003–2004), #1–13
New Mutants, vol. 3 (2009–2012), #1–50
New Mutants, vol. 4  (2019–ongoing)
New X-Men, vol. 1 (2001–2004), #114-–56, Annual #1, previously titled X-Men vol. 2 becomes X-Men from issue #157, then X-Men: Legacy vol. 1 from issue #208
New X-Men, vol. 2 (2004–2008), #1–46, originally titled New X-Men: Academy X vol. 1, name changed from issue #20
Nightcrawler, vol. 3 (2004–2005), #1–12
Nightcrawler, vol. 4 (2014–2015), #1–12

O
Old Man Logan, vol. 2 (2016–2018), #1–50, Annual #1

P
Professor Xavier and the X-Men (1995–1997), #1–18

Q
Quicksilver (1997–1998), #1–13, Heroes For Hire/Quicksilver Annual '98

R
Rogue, vol. 3 (2004–2005), #1–12

S
Sabretooth Classics (1994–1995), #1–15 reprinted various appearances of the popular villain
Savage Wolverine, vol. 1 (2013–2014), #1–23
Sentinel, vol. 1 (2003–2004), #1–12
Spider-Man/Deadpool, vol. 1 (2016–2019), #1–50, #1.MU
Spider-Man and the X-Men, vol. 1 (2014–2015), #1–6
Soldier X, vol 1 (2002–2003), #1–12
Storm, vol. 2 (2006), #1–6
Storm, vol. 3 (2014–2015), #1–11
S.W.O.R.D., vol. 2 (2020–2021), #1–11

U
Ultimate Comics: X-Men (2011–2013), #1–33, #18.1
Ultimate X-Men (2001–2009), #1–100, Annual #1–2, revitalization of the team in the "Ultimate Marvel Universe"
Uncanny X-Force, vol. 1 (2010–2012), #1–35, #5.1, #19.1
Uncanny X-Force, vol. 2 (2013–2014), #1–17
Uncanny X-Men, vol. 1 (1981–2011), #142–544, #534.1, #-1, Annual #5–18, '95–'99, 2000, 2001, Annual #1–3, previously titled X-Men vol. 1
Uncanny X-Men, vol. 2 (2011–2012), #1–20
Uncanny X-Men, vol. 3 (2013–2015), #1–35, #600, Annual #1
Uncanny X-Men, vol. 4 (2016–2017), #1–19, Annual #1
Uncanny X-Men, vol. 5 (2018–2019), #1–22 (LGY #620–634, #638–644), Annual #1

W
Warlock (1999–2000), #1–9
Way of X, vol. 1 (2021), #1–5
Weapon X, vol. 2 (2002–2004), #0–28
Weapon X, vol. 3 (2017–2018), #1–27
Weapon H (2018–2019), #1–12
Wolverine, vol. 2 (1988–2003), #1–189, #102.5, #-1, #, Annual '95-'97, '99, 2000, 2001
Wolverine, vol. 3 (2003–2010), #1–74, Annual #1–2, re-titled Dark Wolverine from (2009–2010) from issue #75
Wolverine, vol. 4 (2010–2012), #1–20, #5.1, #300-317, #900, #1000, Annual #1
Wolverine, vol. 5 (2013–2014), #1–13
Wolverine, vol. 6 (2014), #1–12, Annual #1
Wolverine, vol. 7 (2020–ongoing), #1–
Wolverine: First Class (2008–2009), #1–21
Wolverine: MAX (2012–2014), #1–15
Wolverine: Origins (2006–2010), #1–50, Annual #1
Wolverine: The Best There Is (2010–2011), #1–12
Wolverine and the X-Men, vol. 1 (2011–2014), #1–42, #27AU, Annual #1
Wolverine and the X-Men, vol. 2 (2014), #1–12
Wolverine: Weapon X (2009–2010), #1–16
Wolverines (2015), #1–20

X
X-23, vol. 3 (2010–2012), #1–21
X-23, vol. 4 (2018–2019), #1–12
X-Cellent (2022–ongoing), #1–
X-Corp (2021), #1–5
X-Factor, vol. 1 (1986–1998), #1–149, -1, Annual #1–9
X-Factor, vol. 3 (2005–2013), #1–50, #200–262, #224.1
X-Factor, vol. 4 (2020–2021), #1–10
X-Force, vol. 1 (1991–2002), #1–129, #-1, Annual #1–3, 1999, X-Force and Cable Annual '95–'97, X-Force/Champions Annual '98
X-Force, vol. 3 (2008–2010), #1–28, Annual #1
X-Force, vol. 4 (2014–2015), #1–15
X-Force, vol. 5 (2018–2019), #1–10 (LGY #231–240)
X-Force, vol. 6 (2019–ongoing), #1– , Annual #1
X-Man (1995–2001), #1–75, #-1, Annual '96–'98
X-Men, vol. 1 (1963–1981), #1–66, #94–141, Annual #1–4, re-titled Uncanny X-Men from issue #142
X-Men, vol. 2 (1991–2001), #1–113, #-1, #, Annual #1–3, '95–'97, '99, 2000, X-Men and Dr. Doom Annual '98, re-titled New X-Men vol. 1 from issue #114
X-Men, vol. 2 (2004–2008), #157–207, Annual #1, previously titled New X-Men vol. 1, re-titled X-Men: Legacy from issue #208
X-Men, vol. 3 (2010–2013), #1–41, #15.1, Giant-Size #1
X-Men, vol. 4 (2013–2015), #1–26
X-Men, vol. 5 (2019–2021), #1–21
X-Men, vol. 6 (2021–ongoing), #1–
X-Men 2099 (1993–1996), #1–35
X-Men '92, vol. 2 (2016), #1–10
X-Men Adventures, vol 1 (1992–1994), #1–15, retold stories from the Fox Network's X-Men animated series, Season 1
X-Men Adventures, vol 2 (1994–1995), #1–13, retold stories from the Fox Network's X-Men animated series, Season 2
X-Men Adventures, vol 3 (1995–1996), #1–13, retold stories from the Fox Network's X-Men animated series, Season 3
X-Men Blue (2017–2018), #1–36, Annual #1
X-Men Classic (1990–1995), #46–110, previously titled Classic X-Men, reprinted issues of Uncanny X-Men from the early to mid-1980s
X-Men: Evolution, vol. 1 (2002), #1–9, retold stories from the Warner Brothers Network animated series of the same name
X-Men: First Class, vol. 2 (2007–2008), #1–16
X-Men Forever, vol. 2 (2009–2010), #1–24, Annual #1, Giant-Size #1
X-Men Forever 2 (2010–2011), #1–16
X-Men Gold, vol. 2 (2017–2018), #1–36, Annual #1–2
X-Men: Legacy, vol. 1 (2008–2012), #208–275, #260.1, Annual #1, previously titled X-Men vol. 2
X-Men: Legacy, vol. 2 (2012–2014), #1–24, #300
X-Men Legends, vol. 1 (2021–2022), #1–12
X-Men Legends, vol. 2 (2022–ongoing), #1–
X-Men: Red, vol. 1 (2018), #1–11, Annual #1
X-Men: Red, vol. 2 (2022–ongoing), #1–
X-Men: The Early Years (1994–1995), #1–17, reprinted issues of X-Men, vol. 1 from the early 1960s
X-Men: The Hidden Years (1999–2001), #1–22
X-Men: The Manga (1998–1999), #1–26, a manga-style, Japanese X-Men series
X-Men Unlimited, vol. 1 (1993–2003), #1–50
X-Men Unlimited, vol. 2 (2004–2006), #1–14
X-Men Unlimited Infinity Comics (2021–ongoing), #1– , a Marvel Unlimited exclusive series.
X-Statix (2002–2004), #1–26
X-Treme X-Men, vol. 1 (2001–2004), #1–46, Annual 1
X-Treme X-Men, vol. 2 (2012–2013), #1–13, #7.1

Y
Young X-Men (2008–2009), #1–12

See also
List of Marvel Comics publications
List of X-Men limited series and one-shots

X-Men